Hjalmar "Hjalle" Johannessen (24 May 1907 – 19 August 1959) was a Norwegian athlete who specialized in the 400 and 800 metres, and later a sports writer. He was born in Trondheim, and as an athlete he represented the local club SK Freidig; later Oslo TF.

Competition record 

He became Norwegian 400 metres champion in 1928, 1929, 1930, 1931 and 1935, and 800 metres champion in 1928, 1929, 1931, 1933, 1936 and 1937.

His personal best time was 1:52.1 minutes, achieved in September 1935 in Stockholm. In the 400 metres he had 48.6 seconds, achieved in September 1935 at Bislett stadion.

After retiring he was a sports editor in the newspaper Morgenposten. In 1946 he married Gunvor Høidal from Oslo. The marriage ended in divorce in 1952. He died in 1959.

References

External links

1907 births
1959 deaths
Sportspeople from Trondheim
Norwegian male middle-distance runners
Norwegian male sprinters
Athletes (track and field) at the 1932 Summer Olympics
Athletes (track and field) at the 1936 Summer Olympics
Olympic athletes of Norway
Norwegian sports journalists
20th-century Norwegian writers